The KBS Entertainment Awards is an event held yearly and is sponsored by KBS. The awards ceremony is approximately 140 minutes long and is shown in two parts on KBS2. The ceremony features performances by K-pop artists and music parodies from Gag Concert members. This event is held at the end of each year, except in 2017, the Entertainment Awards were not held due to the KBS Variety Director Strike.

Award categories
Daesang (Grand Prize)
Viewer's Choice Program of the Year
Top Entertainer Award
Special Merit Award
Achievement Award

Comedy division
Male Newcomer Award
Female Newcomer Award
Comedy Show Writer Award
Excellence Award, Female Comedian
Excellence Award, Male Comedian
Top Excellence Award, Male Comedian
Top Excellence Award, Female Comedian
Top Excellence Award, Idea Corner, Comedy Program

Variety division
Male MC Newcomer Award
Female MC Newcomer Award
Variety Show Writer Award
Best Teamwork
Excellence Award, Variety Show Male MC
Excellence Award, Variety Show Female MC
Excellence Award, Idea Corner, Variety Show
Top Excellence Award, Variety Show Male MC
Top Excellence Award, Variety Show Female MC

History of winners
Sources: From 2005 onward.

Grand Prize Award (Daesang)

Viewer's Choice Program of the Year
The Viewer's Choice Program award is chosen by votes from the viewers by SMS.

Top Excellence Award
The Top Excellence Award is awarded to an individual for their appearance in variety and comedy. In recent years, a female and male MC/comedian are awarded in each category.

2002 – 2019 
{| class="wikitable" style=text-align:center
|-
!rowspan=2 style="width:50px"| Year !!colspan=2 style="width:500px"| Variety !!colspan=2 style="width:500px"| Comedy
|- style="background:#F0F8FF"
!Winner(s) !! Program !!Winner(s) !! Program
|-
|rowspan=3 |1st 2002 || rowspan=3 style="width:100px" | Lee Kyung-kyu || rowspan=3 style="width:100px" | Hey! One Night || style="width:200px" | Kang Sung-beom || style="width:200px" |  Gag Concert: Rambling Man
|- style="background:#F0F8FF"
| rowspan=2 | Park Joon-hyung ||  Gag Concert: Beaver Brothers
|- style="background:#F0F8FF"
|  Gag Concert: Young Rats
|-
|rowspan=2 |2nd 2003 || rowspan=2 | Yoo Jae-suk || Super Sunday TV is Fun || rowspan=2 | Jung Yong-cheol ||  Gag Concert: Bongsunga School
|-
| Happy Together Season 1 ||  Gag Concert: Survival Dialect
|- style="background:#F0F8FF"
| 3rd 2004 || Lee Hwi-jae || Sponge || Park Seong-ho ||  Gag Concert: Bongsunga School
|-
|rowspan=2 |4th 2005 || rowspan=2 | Tak Jae-hoon ||  || rowspan=2 | Kim Joon-ho || rowspan=2 |  Gag Concert: Family's Love
|-
| Happy Together Friends
|- style="background:#F0F8FF"
|rowspan=2 |5th 2006 || rowspan=2 | Lee Hwi-jae ||  || rowspan=2 | Jeong Jong-chul || rowspan=2 | Gag Concert: Mappagi
|- style="background:#F0F8FF"
| Sponge
|-
|rowspan=2 |6th 2007 || Nam Hee-seok || Global Talk Show || rowspan=2 |  || rowspan=2 | Gag Concert: We Need Communication
|-
| Hyun Young || Happy Sunday: Heroine 6
|- style="background:#F0F8FF"
| 7th 2008 || Jung Eun-ah || Vitamin || Kim Byung-man || Gag Concert: Master Show
|-
|rowspan=2 |8th 2009 || rowspan=2 | Park Mi-sun || Comedy Star || rowspan=2 | Park Seong-ho || rowspan=2 | Gag Concert: Affectionate Man's Rights Committee
|-
| Happy Together Season 3
|- style="background:#F0F8FF"
|rowspan=3 |9th 2010 || rowspan=2 | Hwang Soo-kyung || rowspan=2 | Open Concert || rowspan=2 | Park Ji-sun || Gag Concert: Solo Heaven Couple Hell
|- style="background:#F0F8FF"
| Gag Concert: Buahjok
|- style="background:#F0F8FF"
| Lee Seung-gi || Happy Sunday: 1 Night 2 Days || Kim Byung-man || Gag Concert: Master Show
|-
| rowspan=2| 10th 2011 || Lee Young-ja || || Jeong Kyung-mi ||
|-
| Lee Soo-geun || || Kim Joon-ho || 
|- style="background:#F0F8FF"
|rowspan=4 | 11th 2012 || rowspan=2 | Lee Young-ja || Hello Counselor || rowspan=2| Shin Bo-ra || rowspan=2| Gag Concert: Discoveries in Life, Brave Guys
|- style="background:#F0F8FF"
| Invincible Youth Season 2
|- style="background:#F0F8FF"
| rowspan=2 | Kim Seung-woo || Win Win || rowspan=2| Kim Jun-hyun || rowspan=2| Gag Concert: Discoveries in Life, Four Men
|- style="background:#F0F8FF"
| Happy Sunday: 1 Night 2 Days – Season 2
|-
| rowspan=2| 12th 2013 || Park Mi-sun || Mamma Mia, Happy Together Season 3 || Kim Ji-min || Gag Concert: BBOOM Entertainment
|-
| Cha Tae-hyun || Happy Sunday: 2 Days & 1 Night – Season 2 and 3 || Kim Jun-hyun || Gag Concert: Just Relax, Goosebumps
|- style="background:#F0F8FF"
| rowspan=2| 13th 2014 || Kim Ji-min || Crisis Escape No. 1Human Condition || Kim Young-hee || Gag Concert
|- style="background:#F0F8FF"
| Choo Sung-hoon || Happy Sunday: The Return of Superman ||  || Gag Concert
|-
| rowspan=2| 14th 2015 || Park Myeong-su || Happy Together Season 3A Look At Myself||  || Gag Concert
|-
| Kim Jong-min || Happy Sunday: 2 Days & 1 Night – Season 3 ||  || Gag Concert
|- style="background:#F0F8FF"
| rowspan=4| 15th 2016 || Kim Sook || Sister's Slam Dunk , Battle Trip||  rowspan=2|  || rowspan=2 |Gag Concert
|- style="background:#F0F8FF"
| Ra Mi-ran || Sister's Slam Dunk
|- style="background:#F0F8FF"
| Jung Jae-hyung || Immortal Songs: Singing the Legend ||  rowspan=2|  || rowspan=2 |Gag Concert
|- style="background:#F0F8FF"
| Lee Dong-gook || Happy Sunday: The Return of Superman
|-
| rowspan=4 |16th2018 || Defconn|| Happy Sunday: 2 Days & 1 Night – Season 3 || rowspan=2 |Shin Bong-sun || rowspan="2" |Gag Concert
|-
|Sam Hammington ||''Happy Sunday: The Return of Superman|-
|Kim Sook|| Battle Trip || rowspan=2 |  || rowspan=2 |Gag Concert
|-
|Moon Hee-joon || Immortal Songs: Singing the Legend
|- style="background:#F0F8FF"
|17th2019
| || Mr. House Husband 2 ||Park Joon-hyung ||Gag Concert: Everyday Dialect, Bababa Brothers
|-
!rowspan=2|Year!!Winner(s) !! Program !!Winner(s) !! Program
|-
!colspan=2 | Variety !!colspan=2 | Comedy
|}

2020 – present 

Excellence Award
The Excellence award is awarded to an individual for their appearance in variety and comedy. In recent years, a female and male MC/comedian are awarded in each category.
2002 – 2019 

2020 – present 

Best Newcomer Award
In recent years, a rookie female and male MC/comedian are awarded in each category.

2002 – 2019

2020 – present 

Top Entertainer Award
From 2002 to 2007, the award was called "Best Entertainer Award". In 2008, it was renamed to "Top Popularity Award". From 2009 to 2019, the award was called "Top Entertainer Award". From  2020, the award was renamed back as "Best Entertainer Award".

2002 – 2019

2020 – present 

Top Excellence Award, Idea (Corner)
For eleven years, Gag Concert has won a Top Excellence Award for Idea (Corner).

Excellence Award, Idea (Corner)

Writer Award

2002 – 2019

2020 – present

Best Teamwork Award

Radio DJ Award

Special Merit / Achievement Award

Producers' Special Award

Best Couple Award

Other awards

2005 – 2019

2020 – present

 Hosts 

 Ratings 

2002 – 2020

2021 – present

 See also 

 List of Asian television awards
 KBS Drama Awards

References

External links

2005 KBS Entertainment Awards 
2006 KBS Entertainment Awards 
2007 KBS Entertainment Awards 
2008 KBS Entertainment Awards 
2009 KBS Entertainment Awards 
2010 KBS Entertainment Awards 
2011 KBS Entertainment Awards 
2012 KBS Entertainment Awards 
2013 KBS Entertainment Awards 
2014 KBS Entertainment Awards 
2015 KBS Entertainment Awards 
2016 KBS Entertainment Awards 
2018 KBS Entertainment Awards 
2019 KBS Entertainment Awards 
2020 KBS Entertainment Awards 
2021 KBS Entertainment Awards  
2022 KBS Entertainment Awards  (Current)'''

Entertainment Awards
South Korean television awards
Awards established in 2002
2002 establishments in South Korea
Annual events in South Korea
South Korea annual television specials